Rosny–Bois Perrier station (French: Gare de Rosny—Bois Perrier) is a French railway station in Rosny-sous-Bois, in Seine-Saint-Denis département, in Île-de-France region.

Location 
The station is at kilometric point 11.216 of Paris–Mulhouse railway. Its altitude is 75 m.

History 
Rosny–Bois Perrier station opened in 1971. Since 1999, it has been part of the RER network and served by trains going through the E4 branch.

The building was demolished and rebuilt in 2010–2011.

Service

Facilities 
The counter in the building is open every day. The station is equipped with automatic ticket machines, real time traffic information systems and facilities for disabled people.

Train service 
Rosny–Bois Perrier is served by RER E trains coming from or bound to Villiers-sur-Marne. Trains from or bound to Tournan call at the station only after 10 pm.

Connections 
The station is served by :

RATP bus lines 102, 116, 121, 143, 145, 221 and 346
Noctilien night bus line N142
 Titus bus line 2

Metro service 
Rosny–Bois Perrier is expected to become the new terminus of Paris metro line 11 by 2022. The metro line 15 should eventually call at the station.

References 

Réseau Express Régional stations
Railway stations in France opened in 1971